= Northern Continent =

The Northern Continent may refer to:

- North America.
- Europe, especially Scandinavia.
- Asia, specifically Siberia.
